Idris El Mizouni (born 26 September 2000) is a professional footballer who plays as a midfielder for Leyton Orient on loan from Ipswich Town. Born in France, he has represented the Tunisia national team.

Club career

Ipswich Town
Born in Paris, El Mizouni came through the academy at Ipswich. He signed his first professional contract on 20 December 2018, signing a two and a half year contract at Ipswich until 2021, with the option of an additional year extension. He made his professional debut for the club on 12 March 2019, in a 1–1 draw against Bristol City at Ashton Gate. El Mizouni made four appearances in his debut season at Portman Road, having progressed through the club's under-18 and under-23 sides into the first team over the course of the 2018–19 season. His progress earned him his first call up to the senior Tunisia squad in June 2019, making him the first player in the club's history to be capped for Tunisia at senior level.

He scored his first professional goal on 4 December 2019, scoring the opening goal in a 1–1 draw with Peterborough United at the London Road Stadium in an EFL Trophy second round tie, with Ipswich going on to win the match 5–6 on penalties.

Cambridge United (loans)
On 23 January 2020, El Mizouni joined League Two club Cambridge United on loan for the remainder of the 2019–20 season. He made his debut for the club on 25 January, appearing as a second-half substitute in a 1–1 draw with Morecambe. He scored his first goal on 11 February, netting a 20-yard free-kick in a 0–2 away win over Scunthorpe United. His loan spell at Cambridge was ended on 2 March after suffering medial ligament damage to his knee during a 1–2 loss to Carlisle United on 29 February, ruling him out of action for the rest of the season. He made 7 appearances during his loan spell at the club, scoring once.

On 22 September 2020, El Mizouni rejoined Cambridge United on a season-long loan for the 2020–21 season. He made his first appearance of the 2020–21 season as a second-half substitute in a 0–0 draw with Tranmere Rovers on 26 September. He did not feature as regularly during his second loan with Cambridge, only making three league starts between September and December. On 3 January, Ipswich took the option to recall El Mizouni from his loan spell. He made 15 appearances in all competitions during his second loan at Cambridge.

Grimsby Town (loan)
On 29 January 2021, El Mizouni joined Grimsby Town on loan for the rest of the 2020–21 season. He made his debut for Grimsby the following day in a match against Stevenage. In March, El Mizouni suffered a hamstring injury, potentially ruling him out for the remainder of the season.

Return to Ipswich
On 10 May 2021, Ipswich announced that they had taken up the option to extend El Mizouni's contract by an additional year, keeping him under contract until 2022. On 9 November 2021, Idris signed a new two-and-a-half year contract with Ipswich, keeping him at the club until 2024, with the option of an additional one-year extension. The following match after signing his new contract, he scored a stunning winner from 30 yards out in a 2–1 win against Oldham Athletic in an FA Cup first round replay, with the goal winning him the Goal of the Round award and a place in the Team of the Round for the FA Cup first round.

International career
Mizouni was born in France and qualifies to play for Tunisia at international level through his father. In 2018 he was called up to the Tunisia Olympic squad for friendlies in preparation for the Africa U-23 Cup of Nations qualifiers. He won his first cap in a friendly match against Italy U23 in Vicenza on 15 October 2018. He scored his first international goal in a 4–1 loss to Egypt on 15 November 2018. 

He made his senior international debut in a friendly on 7 June 2019, coming on as an 81st minute substitute in a 2-0 win over Iraq at the Stade Olympique de Rades stadium in Radès. After making his international debut for his country, he stated "I'm really proud to have been called up, to be able to wear the shirt fills me with pride and happiness."

Career statistics

Club

International

References

External links
Profile at the Ipswich Town F.C. website

2000 births
Living people
Footballers from Paris
French footballers
Tunisian footballers
Tunisia under-23 international footballers
Tunisia international footballers
Association football midfielders
Ipswich Town F.C. players
Cambridge United F.C. players
Grimsby Town F.C. players
Leyton Orient F.C. players
French expatriate footballers
Tunisian expatriate footballers
Expatriate footballers in England
French expatriate sportspeople in England
Tunisian expatriate sportspeople in England
English Football League players
French sportspeople of Tunisian descent